The 2020 Leinster Senior Cup was scheduled to be the 119th staging of the Leinster Football Association's primary competition. It was abandoned after two rounds due to the Coronavirus pandemic. It was scheduled to include all Leinster based League of Ireland clubs from the Premier Division and First Division, as well as a selection of intermediate level sides.

Teams

Preliminary round

The draw for the Preliminary and First Rounds was announced on 10 September 2019.

First round

Second round

The draw for the Second Round was shared by Striker Online on 11 December 2019.

Third round

The draw for the Third Round was announced by the Leinster Football Association on 27 January 2020. All football activity in the Republic of Ireland was halted in March due to the Coronavirus pandemic. No revised dates were announced for planned fixtures and the competition went on hiatus until 2022.

References

2020